Robert Berg (April 7, 1951 – December 5, 2002) was an American jazz saxophonist.

Biography
Berg was born in Brooklyn, New York, United States.

Berg started his musical education at the age of six when he began studying classical piano. He began playing the saxophone at the age of thirteen. He studied at the High School of Performing Arts and Juilliard before leaving school to tour. Berg was influenced by the late 1964–67 period of John Coltrane's music.

A student from the hard bop school, Berg played from 1973 to 1976 with Horace Silver and, from 1977 to 1983, with Cedar Walton. Berg became more widely known when he joined Miles Davis band in 1984. After leaving Davis's band in 1987, Berg released a series of solo albums and also performed and recorded frequently in a group co-led with guitarist Mike Stern. On these albums he played a more accessible style of music, mixing funk, jazz and even country music, with many other diverse compositional elements to produce albums. He often played at the 7th Avenue South NYC club. He worked with Chick Corea, Steve Gadd and Eddie Gómez in a quartet. Berg's tenor saxophone sound was a synthesis of rhythm and blues players such as Junior Walker and Arnett Cobb with the lyricism, intellectual freedom and soul of Wayne Shorter, Joe Henderson and John Coltrane.

Berg was killed in a traffic accident in East Hampton, New York, while driving near his home with Arja, his wife. The person who crashed into his car was driving a cement truck that skidded on ice.

Discography

As leader
 New Birth (Xanadu, 1978)
 Steppin' Live in Europe (Red, 1982)
 Short Stories (Denon, 1987)
 Cycles (Denon, 1988)
 In the Shadows (Denon, 1990)
 Back Roads (Denon, 1991)
 Virtual Reality (Denon, 1992)
 Enter the Spirit (GRP, 1993)
 Riddles (Stretch, 1994)
 Another Standard (Stretch, 1997)
 The Jazz Times Superband (Concord 2000)
 The Meeting (Sound Hills 2009)

As sideman
With Tom Harrell
 Aurora (Adamo, 1976)
 Stories (Contemporary, 1988)
 Visions (Contemporary, 1991)

With Sam Jones
 Changes & Things (Xanadu, 1978)
 Something in Common (Muse, 1978)
 Visitation (SteepleChase, 1978)

With Horace Silver
 Silver 'n Brass (Blue Note, 1975)
 Silver 'n Wood (Blue Note, 1976)
 Silver 'n Voices (Blue Note, 1977)

With Leni Stern
 Clairvoyant (Passport, 1986)
 The Next Day (Passport, 1987)
 Secrets (Enja, 1989)

With Mike Stern
 Upside Downside (Atlantic, 1986)
 Time in Place (Atlantic, 1988)
 Jigsaw (Atlantic, 1989)
 Odds or Evens (Atlantic, 1991)
 Standards and Other Songs (Atlantic, 1992)

With Cedar Walton
Eastern Rebellion 2 (Timeless, 1977)
 Animation (Columbia/CBS, 1978)
 First Set (SteepleChase, 1978)
 Eastern Rebellion 3 (Timeless, 1980)
 Soundscapes (CBS, 1980)
 The Maestro (Muse, 1981)
 Second Set (SteepleChase, 1983)
 Third Set (SteepleChase, 1983)
 Eastern Rebellion 4 (Timeless, 1984)
 Cedar's Blues (Red, 1985)
 Reliving the Moment (HighNote, 2014)

With others
 Karrin Allyson, Ballads (Concord Jazz, 2001)
 Frans Bak, Hymn to the Rainbow (L+R, 1992)
 Randy Brecker, Live at Sweet Basil (Sonet, 1989)
 Gary Burton, Cool Nights (GRP, 1991)
 Gary Burton, Six Pack (GRP, 1992)
 Dennis Chambers, Getting Even (Glass House, 1992)
 Joe Chambers, Phantom of the City (Candid, 1992)
 Marc Copland, Stompin' with Savoy (Savoy 1995)
 Chick Corea, Time Warp (Stretch, 1995)
 Tom Coster, Let's Set the Record Straight (JVC, 1993)
 Tom Coster, The Forbidden Zone (JVC, 1994)
 Pino Daniele, Scio (EMI, 1984)
 Miles Davis, You're Under Arrest  (Columbia, 1985)
 Barbara Dennerlein, That's Me (Enja, 1992)
 Niels Lan Doky, The Truth (Storyville, 1988)
 Niels Lan Doky, Dreams (Milestone, 1990)
 Kenny Drew Jr., The Flame Within (Jazz City, 1989)
 Kenny Drew, Lite Flite (SteepleChase, 1977)
 Eliane Elias, A Long Story (Manhattan, 1991)
 Al Foster, Mr. Foster (Better Days, 1979)
 Antonio Farao, Far Out (CAM Jazz, 2002)
 Carl Filipiak, Right on Time (Geometric, 1993)
 Carl Filipiak, Peripheral Vision (Geometric, 1997)
 Dizzy Gillespie, Rhythmstick (1990)
 Gerald Gradwohl, ABQ (EmArcy, 2003)
 Eddie Henderson, So What (Eighty-Eight's, 2002)
 Monika Herzig, The Time Flies (Flavoredtune 2018)
 Billy Higgins, Soweto (Red, 1979)
 Billy Higgins, Once More (Red, 1980)
 Dieter Ilg, Summerhill (Lipstick, 1991)
 B.B. King, Here & There (Hip-O, 2001)
 Joe Locke, 4 Walls of Freedom (Sirocco, 2003)
 Mike Mandel, Utopia Parkway (Vanguard, 1980)
 John McNeil, Embarkation (SteepleChase, 1978)
 Jason Miles, World Tour (Lipstick, 1994)
 Jason Miles, Miles to Miles (Narada, 2005)
 Idris Muhammad, House of the Rising Sun (Kudu, 1976)
 Idris Muhammad, You Ain't No Friend of Mine! (Fantasy, 1978)
 Wolfgang Muthspiel, Timezones (Amadeo, 1989)
 Wolfgang Muthspiel, The Promise (Amadeo, 1990)
 Players Association, Turn the Music Up! (Vanguard, 1979)
 Players Association, We Got the Groove! (Vanguard, 1980)
 Valery Ponomarev, A Star for You (Reservoir, 1997)
 Tom Schuman, Extremities (GRP, 1990)
 Ben Sidran, Life's a Lesson (Go Jazz, 1993)
 Steps Ahead, Holding Together (NYC, 2002)
 Ulf Wakenius, Venture (L+R, 1992)
 Gary Willis, Bent (Alchemy, 1998)

References

External links
Biography

1951 births
2002 deaths
Jazz musicians from New York (state)
Musicians from Brooklyn
20th-century saxophonists
American jazz saxophonists
American male saxophonists
Jewish American musicians
Jewish jazz musicians
American male jazz musicians
Miles Davis Quintet members
Steps Ahead members
Xanadu Records artists
20th-century American male musicians